Alex Samuel (born 27 December 2002) is a Scottish rugby union player who plays for Glasgow Warriors at the Lock position.

Rugby Union career

Amateur career

Samuel went to St Leonards School in St. Andrews, and then went on to Madras College. He then played for Madras College FP.

Professional career

He moved to Glasgow Warriors in 2020, initially with the Scottish Rugby Academy, before graduating from the academy with a permanent deal with the Glasgow club. Then Warriors' Head Coach Danny Wilson marked out Samuel as one to watch in a supporters event in 2020.

While at the academy he was aligned to Stirling Wolves in the Super 6.

Samuel played for the Ayrshire Bulls under Peter Horne in the Super 6 in the Fosroc Super Sprint championship.

He made his debut for Glasgow Warriors against the Ayrshire Bulls on 2 September 2022 at Inverness as a replacement.

He then made his competitive debut for the Warriors against Benetton Rugby on 28 October 2022 in the United Rugby Championship in a 6 try win. He became only the fifth teenager to make his debut playing in the second row for the club. He became Glasgow Warrior No. 346.

Because of his Warriors debut he could not play in the Super 6 final between Ayrshire Bulls and Watsonians the following day. However Samuel said of his Warriors start: "It was a bit of a dream come true. Usually I’m on the other side of the fence as a fan, have been for about the last 10 years. It’s pretty cool."

He followed that up with a start against Leinster Rugby at the RDS Arena on 26 November 2022 in the following round match.

International career

Samuel captained the Scotland U20 side in 2021.

He has been invited to train with the senior Scotland squad for the 2021 Six Nations Championship, but has yet to receive a full senior cap.

References

2002 births
Living people
People educated at St Leonards School
Sportspeople from St Andrews
Glasgow Warriors players
Scottish rugby union players
Ayr RFC players
Rugby union locks
Madras College FP players
Stirling County RFC players